Enza is a given name. Notable people with the name include:

Enza Anderson (born 1964), Canadian journalist and politician
Enza Barilla (born 1991), Australian football player
Enza Petrilli or Vincenza Petrilli (born 1990), Italian paralympic archer

See also
Vincenza, given name